Wu Jintao (born 6 January 1975) is a Chinese cross-country skier. He competed at the 1992 Winter Olympics and the 1998 Winter Olympics.

References

1975 births
Living people
Chinese male cross-country skiers
Olympic cross-country skiers of China
Cross-country skiers at the 1992 Winter Olympics
Cross-country skiers at the 1998 Winter Olympics
Place of birth missing (living people)
Cross-country skiers at the 1996 Asian Winter Games
Cross-country skiers at the 1999 Asian Winter Games